CFPV-FM was a Canadian radio station. Owned by McBride Communications, the station broadcasts at 98.9 FM in Pemberton, British Columbia.

History
On November 27, 2006, 0749943 BC Ltd. (Matthew G. McBride) received approval from the Canadian Radio-television and Telecommunications Commission (CRTC) to operate a new english-language FM radio station at Pemberton.

By late November 2007, studio space was leased and prepared, but problems arose with the transmitter installation on Signal Hill, and further problems with telephone line installations delayed the sign-on. CFPV-FM signed on June 6, 2008 at 7:00am.

On February 28, 2020, the CRTC denied a renewal to CFPV's license (which expires on March 31, 2020), citing a long-term pattern of non-compliance with various regulatory and license requirements, including a failure to keep and submit complete and accurate program logs, failure to pay required contributions to Canadian content development (CCD), failure to broadcast on-air notices informing listeners of its previous non-compliance, as well as a poor commitment to on-air content of local interest.

References

External links
CFPV FM
 
 

FPV
FPV
Radio stations established in 2008
2008 establishments in British Columbia
Radio stations disestablished in 2020
2020 disestablishments in British Columbia
FPV
FPV